Alden Chester (September 4, 1848 - February 12, 1934) was a New York Supreme Court Justice.

He was born in Westford, New York, to Alden Chester and Susan G. Chester (née Draper).  He worked as a telegraph operator, a newspaper editor, and an insurance clerk, and then attended Columbia University, graduating with a law degree in 1871, and went into law practice with Andrew Draper.  He married Lena Thurber on October 5, 1871.

He was elected Supreme Court Justice as a Republican in October 1895 in the Third Judicial District.  He moved to the appellate division from 1902 to 1910.  He retired in 1918 when he reached the age limit for the position.

He died on February 12, 1934.  He was survived by his daughter, Amy Chester Merrick.

References 

New York Supreme Court Justices
1848 births
1934 deaths